Gina St. John (born in Natchez, Mississippi, USA) is an American actress and entertainment reporter, active since 1994.

Biography
She was once a radio presenter in Roanoke, Virginia and Cleveland, Ohio.
She has hosted shows including CNET Central and E! News Daily (1997-2008), and has had roles in television dramas such as Crossing Jordan, NCIS and Commander in Chief. In 2000 she became a game show host, with the Lifetime game show Who Knows You Best?.

Filmography

Films

TV

References

External links

American film actresses
American television actresses
Living people
Entertainment journalists
Year of birth missing (living people)
People from Natchez, Mississippi
Actresses from Mississippi
21st-century American women